The French Prudential Supervision and Resolution Authority (ACPR), formerly known as Prudential Supervision Authority (ACP), is an independent administrative authority which exercises prudential supervision of regulated French financial firms such as banks and insurance companies. It operates under the aegis of the Bank of France.

Background

A number of financial supervisory authorities were created in France over the years and with various mandates. These included: 
 the Bank Supervisory Commission (CCB), established in 1941 and renamed in 1984 the  

History

In January 2010, the ACP was formed by executive order through the merger of the Banking Commission, ACAM, and CECEI. A new executive order in July 2013 granted it resolution authority, in the context of the formation of the European Single Resolution Mechanism, and correspondingly changed its name from ACP to ACPR.

The Secretary-General is the ACPR's chief executive officer. The successive Secretaries-General of ACP, then ACPR have been: 
 Danièle Nouy (March 2010 - December 2013), previously Secretary-General of the Banking Commission since 2003
 Edouard Fernandez-Bollo (January 2014 - September 2019)
 Dominique Laboureix (October 2019 - present)
Conducted from July 2020 to April 2021, the first assessment of financial risks due to climate change was carried out by the ACPR and included 22 insurance organizations and 9 banking groups.

Operations

The ACPR is an independent administrative authority attached to the Banque de France, with the Governor of the Bank of France acting as its chairman. Its stated purposes include supervision and control, preservation of the stability of the financial system and protection of clients, insured participants and beneficiaries who are subject to its control. The ACPR have supervisory powers, the power to impose administrative enforcement measures, and disciplinary powers with respect to entities under its jurisdiction. It may also make public any information that it deems necessary to discharge its duties.

It consists of three different decision-making bodies: the Supervisory College, the Resolution College and the Sanctions Committee, as well as some consultative bodies, such as the Audit Committee and the Scientific Consultative Committee.

The ACPR occasionally launches public consultations on different issues, as was the case in 2013, when it drafted the regulations for crowdfunding following a public consultation launched alongside the Autorité des marchés financiers and the French Ministry of the Economy and Finance.

See also
 Autorité des marchés financiers (France)
 Tracfin

References

External links
  Official site

France
Government agencies of France
Regulation in France